Qalehcheh (also Romanized as Qal‘ehcheh; also known as Qal‘echeh) is a village in Takab Rural District, in the Central District of Dargaz County, Razavi Khorasan Province, Iran. At the 2006 census, its population was 97, in 30 families.

References 

Populated places in Dargaz County